East Harrisburg Cemetery is an historic cemetery located outside of the city limits of Harrisburg, Pennsylvania. The older, eastern section of the cemetery is located within the borough of Penbrook; the western section is located in Susquehanna Township, Dauphin County.

History
Established in 1874, the cemetery received its name from its location. Straddling the border between the borough of Penbrook, formerly known as East Harrisburg, and Susquehanna Township, the cemetery's operations were administered in 1875 by David Mumma (president) and Samuel Landis (secretary-treasurer). Lots sold from "10 to 25 [each], according to location" in 1875.

As of 2019, the cemetery remained in active use.

Notable burials
 Les Bell (1901–1985) – was a professional baseball player
 Isaac Hoffer Doutrich (1871–1941) – was a Republican member of the U.S. House of Representatives from Pennsylvania, former city councilman of Harrisburg.
 Walter Mann Mumma (1890–1961) – was a prominent businessman and Republican member of the U.S. House of Representatives from Pennsylvania.
 Frank Crawford Sites (1864–1935) – was a Democratic member of the U.S. House of Representatives from Pennsylvania.

See also
 List of Pennsylvania cemeteries

References

External links
 East Harrisburg Cemetery (website). Retrieved May 20, 2019.
 

Cemeteries established in the 1870s
Cemeteries in Harrisburg, Pennsylvania
History of Harrisburg, Pennsylvania
1874 establishments in Pennsylvania